CPI(ML) or CPI-ML or CPIML may refer to:

Political organizations

Political parties 
Communist Party of India (Marxist–Leninist) Liberation, the Indian political party, widely considered as the successor of the original Communist Party of India (Marxist–Leninist).
Communist Party of India (Marxist–Leninist), 1969–1972, former Indian political party which split from the Communist Party of India (Marxist) 
Communist Party of India (Marxist–Leninist) New Democracy, active remnant of the original Communist Party of India (Marxist–Leninist).
Communist Party of India (Marxist–Leninist) Class Struggle, active remnant of the original Communist Party of India (Marxist–Leninist).
Communist Party of India (Marxist–Leninist) Red Star, active remnant of the original Communist Party of India (Marxist–Leninist).
Communist Party of India (Marxist–Leninist) Janashakti, active remnant of the original Communist Party of India (Marxist–Leninist).
Communist Party of Ireland (Marxist–Leninist), 1965–2003, former Irish political party.

Others 

 Communist Party of India (Marxist-Leninist) Red Flag, former name of the Marxist-Leninist Party of India (Red Flag)

See also
Communist Party of India (disambiguation)